Thomas Barton Coombs (born May 31, 1959) is a former American football tight end. He played in the National Football League (NFL) for the New York Jets from 1982 to 1983.

References

1959 births
Living people
American football tight ends
Puget Sound Loggers football players
Idaho State Bengals football players
New York Jets players